The KBO–NPB Club Championship 2009 was contested between the champions of Nippon Professional Baseball's Japan Series, and the Korea Baseball Organization's Korean Series on Saturday, 14 November 2009. The game was played at the Nagasaki Baseball Stadium. The 2009 Championship was won by Japan's Yomiuri Giants.

Game summary

References

2009
2009 in baseball
2009 in Japanese sport
2009 in South Korean sport
2009
KBO-NPB Club Championship

ja:日韓クラブチャンピオンシップ#2009年